Chen Qian (born April 16, 1993) is a Chinese swimmer.

References 
 
 Profile at gz2010.cn

1993 births
Living people
Swimmers from Qingdao
Chinese female freestyle swimmers
World Aquatics Championships medalists in swimming
Olympic swimmers of China
Swimmers at the 2012 Summer Olympics
Medalists at the FINA World Swimming Championships (25 m)